NGC 4015 is a lenticular galaxy in the Coma Berenices. It is located between 215 and 220 million light years away. Its visual magnitude is 13.15.

It was first discovered by Danish astronomer John Dreyer on 26 April 1878, and he described it as a "faint object, very small and with a much brighter middle." He also described it in his notes on the accompanying galaxy, PGC 37703, which he described as "a tail north of the nucleus".

Together, NGC 4015 and PGC 37703 comprise Arp 138 in the Atlas of Peculiar Galaxies.

Sources

Lenticular galaxies
4015
Coma Berenices